Mount DeVoe is a mountain on Vancouver Island, British Columbia, Canada, located  southeast of Gold River and  south of Rambler Peak.

See also
List of mountains in Canada

References

Vancouver Island Ranges
One-thousanders of British Columbia
Nootka Land District